The 2014–15 Fordham Rams men's basketball team represented Fordham University during the 2014–15 NCAA Division I men's basketball season. The team is coached by Tom Pecora in his fifth year at the school. Fordham Rams home games were played at Rose Hill Gymnasium and the team was a member of the Atlantic 10 Conference. They finished the season 10–21, 4–14 in A-10 play to finish in a tie for twelfth place. They advanced to the second round of the A-10 tournament where they lost to VCU.

On March 18, head coach Tom Pecora was fired. He finished at Fordham with a five year record of 44–106.

Previous season 
The Rams finished the season 10–21, 4–14 in A-10 play to finish in last place. They advanced to the second round of the A-10 tournament where they lost to Dayton.

Departures

Incoming recruits

Roster

Schedule and results

|-
!colspan=9 style="background:#76032E; color:#FFFFFF;"| Non-conference regular season

|-
!colspan=9 style="background:#76032E; color:#FFFFFF;"| Atlantic 10 regular season

|-
!colspan=9 style="background:#76032E; color:#FFFFFF;"| Atlantic 10 tournament

See also
2014–15 Fordham Rams women's basketball team

References

Fordham
Fordham Rams men's basketball seasons